Klaus Baard Baess (10 November 1924 – 16 September 2018) was a Danish competitive sailor and Olympic medalist. He was born in Frederiksberg. He won a bronze medal in the Dragon class at the 1948 Summer Olympics in London, together with William Berntsen and Ole Berntsen. Baess died on 16 September 2018 at the age of 93.

References

External links
 
 
 

1924 births
2018 deaths
Danish male sailors (sport)
Olympic sailors of Denmark
Olympic bronze medalists for Denmark
Olympic medalists in sailing
Sailors at the 1948 Summer Olympics – Dragon
Medalists at the 1948 Summer Olympics
Sportspeople from Frederiksberg